Deir Mama is a village in northwestern Syria, administratively part of the Hama Governorate, located west of Hama. It is situated at the eastern side of the coastal al-Ansariyah mountains. Nearby localities include Masyaf to the south, Deir al-Salib to the southwest and al-Laqbah and Deir Shamil to the north. According to the Syria Central Bureau of Statistics (CBS), Deir Mama had a population of 2,985 in the 2004 census. The inhabitants of Deir Mama are predominantly Alawites.

Deir Mama has two main springs, the southern and northern regions, and the central village spreads between them with one main road. Deir Mama's history goes back to the Roman era; it was the only village in Masyaf region that was not under feudal rule, unlike the neighboring villages. Deir Mama's residents have included intellectuals, including one reputed novelist and theater writer Mamdouh Adwan. Alawites and Christians share a shrine that each group worships. Alawites refer to it as Sheikh Sobeh while Christians call it Saint Mama. Deir Mama is famous for making the traditional Arak liquor and natural silk handicraft.

References

Bibliography

Populated places in Masyaf District
Alawite communities in Syria